Dr. Freeland (foaled 1926) was an American Thoroughbred racehorse best known for his win in the Preakness Stakes, the then first leg of the 1929 United States Triple Crown of Thoroughbred Racing.  He was named for Dr. John Freeland, a prominent New York City banker.

Trained by U.S. Racing Hall of Fame inducteeThomas J. Healey,  Dr. Freeland was bred and raced by Walter J. Salmon, Sr., a major New York City real estate developer and owner of Mereworth Farm near Lexington, Kentucky whom Bloodhorse magazine called  "one of the leading breeder/owners of the 20th century". It was Salmon's third win of the prestigious race having won it in 1923 with Vigil and in 1926 with Display.

The 1929 Preakness Stakes was run on May 11 with the Kentucky Derby the following Saturday. After Dr. Freeland's win, his owner decided not to run him in the Derby but instead to rest him for the June 29th Belmont Stakes. At a mile and a half, the Belmont proved too much for Dr. Freeland and he finished eighth and last.

On November 29, 1931, Walter Salmon sold Dr. Freeland to Bennet Creech. Dr. Freeland raced into 1935, winning several other minor and mid-level races.

Pedigree

References

External links
Dr. Freeland's pedigree and partial racing stats

1926 racehorse births
Racehorses bred in Kentucky
Racehorses trained in the United States
Preakness Stakes winners
Thoroughbred family 19-b